Kevin Toolis is a journalist and filmmaker.

Early life 
Toolis was born and raised in Edinburgh to parents who were from Achill, County Mayo, Ireland.  He brought up his daughter Storme Toolis in London.

Career 
Toolis is a filmmaker and journalist who had written for The Guardian, The New York Times,  and the Daily Mirror.  He won a BAFTA for his torture drama, "Complicit". Toolis has written screenplays and founded the independent television company ManyRiversFilms.

Bibliography 

 Rebel Hearts – Journey's Within The IRA's Soul -  (1995)
 The Confessions of Gordon Brown - (2004)
 My Father's Wake: How The Irish Teach Us To Live, Love And Die -  (2017)
 Nine Rules To Conquer Death -  (2020)

Filmography 
 The Cult of the Suicide Bomber (2005)
 The Cult of the Suicide Bomber (2006)
 Car Bomb (2008)
 Complicit (2013)

References 

21st-century Scottish writers
Scottish filmmakers
Year of birth missing (living people)
Living people
Writers from Edinburgh
Scottish people of Irish descent
Scottish television writers
Scottish journalists